Mieczysław Burda (19 April 1916 – 29 April 1990) was a Polish ice hockey player. He played for Dąb Katowice, KTH Krynica, Cracovia, and Gwardia Bydgoszcz during his career. He also played for the Polish national team at the 1948 Winter Olympics, and three world championships, in 1937, 1938, and 1939. After his playing career he turned to coaching.

References

External links
 

1916 births
1990 deaths
Ice hockey players at the 1948 Winter Olympics
MKS Cracovia (ice hockey) players
KTH Krynica players
Olympic ice hockey players of Poland
Polish ice hockey forwards
Sportspeople from Kraków
Polish Austro-Hungarians